Postal codes in Sri Lanka are five digit numbers used by Sri Lanka Postal Service, that identifies each postal jurisdiction to sort mail more efficiently. They were first introduced in 1997.

See also
 ISO 3166-2:LK
 Sri Lanka Post
 Subdivisions of Sri Lanka
 Telephone numbers in Sri Lanka

References

Sri Lanka
Postal system of Sri Lanka
Sri Lanka communications-related lists
Philately of Sri Lanka